Jimma Aba Jifar Football Club (Amharic: ጅማ አባ ጅፋር; Afaan Oromo: Jimmaa Abbaa Jifaar) is a professional football club based in Jimma, Ethiopia. They play in the Ethiopian Higher League, the second division of Ethiopian football. The club, who was formally known as Jimma City, was promoted to the Ethiopian Premier League for the first time after the end of the 2016–17 season.

History 
The club was founded in 1983 (1975 E.C.). The club finished first in the Ethiopian Higher League (second division) Group B after the 2016/17 season, by virtue earning a promotion to the 2017/18 Ethiopian Premier League. The club has since signed some notable foreign players to the side, including Nigerian striker Okiki Afolabi and Ghanaian Goalkeeper Daniel Agyei.

The club won the 2017/18 Ethiopian Premier League title. Shortly after the 2017–18 season their manager, Gebremedin Haile, left the club to sign with another Premier League club, Mekelle City FC.

The club participated in 2018-19 CAF Champions League as the only representative from Ethiopia. They defeated ASAS Djibouti Télécom  5-3 on aggregate in parliamentary round. However, they made their exit from the tournament in the next round courtesy of a 2-1 aggregate defeat to Egyptian giants Al-Ahly. 

FIFA imposed a transfer ban on club in 2020 for unpaid wages to Ghanaian goalkeeper Daniel Agyei.

Stadium 
The club plays its matches at Jimma Stadium located in Jimma, Ethiopia. In 2021, Jimma University Stadium was chosen to host matches from week 7 to 11 of the 2020-21 Ethiopian Premier League season.

Honors

Domestic 
 Ethiopian Premier League: 1

2018

African 

 CAF Champions League: 1 appearance
 2018-19 – First Round

CAF Confederations Cup: 1 appearance

2018-19 – Play-off Round

Players

First-team squad
As of 14 January 2021

Club Officials

Coaching Staff 

 Manager/Head Coach: Zemariam Damtew 
 Assistant coach: Yosef Ali 
 Goalkeeper coach: Mohamed Jemal 
 Team Leader: Jehud Kedir 
 Physiotherapist: Senay Yilma

Former Managers 
  Gebremedin Haile
 Paulos Getachew

References

Football clubs in Ethiopia
Sport in Oromia Region